Hereditary chiefs in Canada are leaders within some First Nations in Canada who represent different houses or clans and who, according to some interpretations of case law from the Supreme Court of Canada, have jurisdiction over territories that fall outside of band-controlled reservation land. Passed down intergenerationally, hereditary chieftaincies are rooted in traditional forms of Indigenous governance models which predate colonization. The Indian Act (1876), still in force today, imposed electoral systems to fill band council positions. Although recognized by and accountable to the Government of Canada, band chiefs do not hold the cultural authority of hereditary chiefs, who often serve as knowledge keepers responsible for the upholding of a First Nation's traditional customs, legal systems, and cultural practices.

It was hereditary chiefs of the Gitxsan and Wetʼsuwetʼen who acted as plaintiffs in the Delgamuukw v British Columbia decision (1997) of the Supreme Court of Canada. The ruling, overturning a lower court decision, has been important to ongoing definition of the protection of Aboriginal title in relation to section 35 of Canada's Constitution Act, 1982, and also significant in accepting the standing of the hereditary chiefs as plaintiffs, relying on their authority to speak for their communities and nations.

See also
 Office of the Hereditary Chiefs of the Wetʼsuwetʼen
 Monarchy of Canada

References

Indigenous leaders in Canada
First Nations governments